The Issa Musa or ‘Isa Musa  (Full Name: ’Isa ibn Musa ibn Zubayr ibn Abd al-Raḥmān ibn ash-Shaykh Isḥāq ibn Aḥmad ) is a northern Somali clan. Its members form a part of the Habr Awal clan of the Isaaq clan family. The Isa Musa are divided into four major sub-clans:  Mohammed Issa, Adam Issa, Abokor Issa and Idarais Issa. The Isa Musa traditionally consists of coastal people, nomadic pastoralist and merchants. This clan are primarily settled in Somaliland, including Maroodi Jeex, Togdheer, Sahil, Ethiopia, as well as Kenya.
The Issa Musse have produced many prominent Somali figures with the Undersecretary General of the United Nations Abdulrahim Abby Farah, the first Somali Prime Minister & second President of Somaliland Muhammad Haji Ibrahim Egal,current Ctrack Middle East Sales Manager Abdul Wahab Jama Abdi and the second tallest man in the world Hussein Bisad.

History 

Historically, the Isa Musa made use of the very valuable caravan trade in the Horn of Africa. Deriving income from arriving caravans into the markets of the coastal city of Berbera. The Isa Musa were able to impose a transit duty of 4 units of ana per camel loaded with merchandise.The Isa Musa, whose pasture area is the coastal plain, also raise a transit duty of 4 anas (approx. 48 pfennigs) from the caravans for the loaded dromedar and 1 ana for each sheep and each goat, which from other tribes after the Markets to be brought from Berbera.The Italian explorer and geographer Luigi Robecchi Brichetti had a similar remark in aspect of the valuable caravan trade, where he also mentioned the related Ayal Ahmad of Habr Awal - who reserved the title as the Abban of Berbera.

According to the account of Bricchetti, the Isa Musa were able to attain revenue thanks to the busy caravan traffic entering & leaving the coastal and historical city of BerberaThey pass for skilled camel breeders and intelligent caravan organizers [Ayal Achmed]. And such are also the different families of the Isa Musa, who live off the caravan traffic with the Ogaden, going up to Uebi [Webi] along the Faf (Fafan) route.The Isa Musa, along with the wider Habr Awal clan family, formed the majority of the Somali merchants who frequented Aden and other Southern Arabian ports. Conducting independent trading expeditions on their own vessels to Arabian ports. They procured various raw goods from Harar and the interior in exchange for manufactured goods. During their stay, the Habr Awal rented their own houses and hired their own servants, whereas other Somali clans tended to stay with relatives already established across the Gulf.Merchants. — These are generally members of the Habr Awal tribe. They bring from Harrar and the Galla country, coffee, saffron (bastard), tusks (ivory), and feathers, taking away in return zinc, brass, broad cloth, and piece goods. They remain in Aden for about twenty days at a time during the trading season, which lasts about nine months,' making four trips. During their residence they hire a house, and are accompanied by their own domestics.The ‘Isa Musa, weren’t only involved in the commodity trade but also in the livestock trade. Exporting their livestock to Southern Arabian ports like Aden through Berbera. According to a 1895 publication by Captain H. G. C. Swayne.the Esa Musa export their cattle and sheep to Aden. They have agents at Berbera, and as opportunities offer, batches of, say, ten oxen or two hundred sheep are brought down for export, marching by easy stages. Coming from Bur’o, eighty miles from the coast, cattle or sheep reach Berbera in four to six days, while caravans generally cover the distance in three days.

Clans

 
A summarized clan family, with four of the major subclans of Issa Mussa is presented below.

Sheikh Isaaq Bin Ahmed (Sheikh Isaaq)
Habar Habuusheed
  Ahmed (Tol-Ja'lo) 
  Muuse (Habr Je'lo)
  Ibrahiim (Sanbuur)
  Muhammad ('Ibraan)
 Habar Magaadle
 Ismail (Garhajis )
  Muhammad (Arap)
 Ayub
 Abdirahman (Subeer Awal) (Habr Awal)
 Afgab Musse 
 Abdi Musse
 Abdalle Musse
 Igalle Musse
 Eli Musse
 Sa’ad Musse

The four major subclans of Issa Musse are:

 Abokor Issa 
 Iderias Issa
 Adam Issa 
 Mohammed Issa

Notable figures 
 Sultan Osman Sultan Ali Koshin, the current general sultan of the Issa Musse clans, his family was the traditional sultanate holders of Issa Mussa clans
 Hussain Bisad, the second tallest man in the world, prevoiusly held the record for the largest hands of anyone alive 
 Abdulrahim Abby Farah, Under-Secretary-General of the United Nations 1979–1990 and Permanent Representative of Somali Republic to the United Nations 1965–1972.
 Muhammad Haji Ibrahim Egal, first Somali prime minister 1960, double time prime minister 1967–1969. President of Somaliland, 1993–2002.
 General Ahmed Mohamoud Farah “Ina lah-was”, former vice-president of Somalia and member of the 5th Supreme Revolutionary Council (SRC) of Somalia
 Aar Guruxeed- Geologist and philosopher specializing in rural and urban culture. until 1939 he was famous for his political slogans and short poems and catchword which he recited on the forum.
Ahmed Mohamed Obsiye Speaker of the Parliament of Somali Republic 1964-1967.
 Ahmed Yusuf Yasin, former vice-prisdent of Somaliland and the former second chairman of UDUB party 2002-2010.
 Ali Jama Habil, contemporary Somali poet of the golden age
Ali Omar Mohamed “Ali Hor-hor”, former longest serving general manager of Berbera Port the current served as the Minister of Employment, Social and Family Affairs of the Republic of Somaliland (MoESFA)
Said Hassan Abdilahi, current General Manager of the port of Berbera
 Hassan Gadhweyneh, the Deputy-Mayor of Mogadishu(1975-1991), Governor of Sahil region(1998-2003, the Mayor of Berbera(1998-2003) and the longest serving Minister of Education of Somaliland (2003-2010
 Sheikh Osman Noor, the first religious leader of Burao Togdheer
 Armiye Odowa’a, the first major of Burao Togdheer
 Jamal Ali Hussein Somali politician and economist, former Chief Executive Officer (CEO) for Citi Bank Tanzania, former presidential candidate of UCID party in Somaliland
Abdullahi Abokor Osman, current Ministry of Transportation and Roads Development of the Republic of Somaliland
Abdi Haybe Laampad, comedian
 Dr. Saad Ali Shire, currently serving as the Minister of Finance in the Republic of Somaliland. Shire formerly served as the Foreign Minister of Somaliland
 Adan Haji Ali, the current Chief Justice Ministry of Justice (Somaliland)
 Abdishakur Iddin, the current Mayor of Berbera which is the former capital of Somaliland before Hargeisa

References

External links

 "The Somali Ethnic Group and Clan System", from "Reunification of the Somali People", Jack L. Davies
 Map - Berbera - MAP[N]ALL.COM
Somalia Recent Economic and Political Developments Handbook Volume 1 Strategic Information and Developments
https://www.somaliland.com/news/somaliland/somaliland-partners-consult-with-chief-justice-of-the-supreme-court/
Somalia Mineral & Mining Sector Investment and Business Guide
Anatomy of Violence: Understanding the Systems of Conflict and Violence in Africa

Wasiir Cabdilaahi Abokor Oo Ku Margaday Su’aalo Xasaasi Oo Lagu Waydiiyay Waraysi Lala Yeeshay – somalilandtoday.com

 
Demographics of Somaliland